The military budget or defence budget of India is the portion of the overall budget of Union budget of India that is allocated for the funding of the Indian Armed Forces. The military budget finances employee salaries and training costs, maintenance of equipment and facilities, support of new or ongoing operations, and development and procurement of new technologies, weapons, equipment, and vehicles.

The Indian Army accounts for more than half of the total defence budget of India, with most of the expenditure going to the maintenance of cantonments, salaries and pensions, instead of critical arms and ammunition.

Overview 
India's defence budget includes allocation for the three defence services, army, navy and air force. It also includes allocation for the ordnance factories, research and development, and capital outlay. Additionally there are civil defence expenditures such as pensions. Unofficial expenditure includes expenses for four of the six Central Armed Police Forces responsible for border security. Space and atomic energy is funded separately.

Expenditures

2017–18 
Union Minister for Finance allocated  of the 2017 Union budget of India for development in the Indian armed forces, marking a raise of around 7% from the previous fiscal year.

2018–19 
In presenting the Defence Budget of 2018-19 Finance Minister allocated ₹4,04,365 crore (US$ 63 billion) for the Ministry of Defence (MOD). This translates into an increase of 5.66% over 2017-18 defence budget.

2019–20 
As 2019 was an election year the NDA government presented an interim budget in place of a regular budget as per the general practice. In the interim budget an allocation of ₹4,31,011 crores (US$61.573 billion) was made. On its re-election the NDA government kept the military budget unchanged. However the actual expenditure exceeded the estimated amount and final spending of defence for 2019-20 stood at ₹4,48,820 crores (US$62.71 Billion). So there was an increase of around 10% with respect to previous budget.

2020–21 
The allocation for defence during the fiscal year 2020-21 stood at (US$73.86 Billion). This amounted to an increase of nearly 9%.

2022-23 

The allocation for defence during the fiscal year 2022 -23 stood at 76.88 billion dollar, making it the third highest in the world after USA and China.

Spending (% of GDP)

The above statistics were collected by World Bank up to 2018.

Capital Acquisition

The above data was published by the Institute for Defence Studies and Analyses.

See also
Union budget of India
Railway budget of India

References

Bibliography

Further reading

Books

Reports

Journals

News 
 
 

Ministry of Defence (India)
Union budgets of India
India